Ready for the Flood is an album by former Jayhawks  bandmates Mark Olson and Gary Louris, released in Europe on December 1, 2008, and in the US on January 29, 2009. It was their first collaboration since Olson had left the band in 1995.

The songwriting and recording sessions for the album resulted from a visit by Louris to Olson's home in California in late 2001. The duo asked Chris Robinson to produce the recording. They briefly toured to support the album.

Reception

Writing for Allmusic, music critic Mark Deming called the album "...unlikely to disappoint fans of their old band. But while they mine a thoughtful country-folk vein that's not far removed from Jayhawks territory, Olson and Louris take a somewhat softer, more acoustic-based, balladic approach here than they did in the Jayhawks days, lending Ready for the Flood a warm, honeyed glow."

Track listing
All songs by Mark Olson & Gary Louris

"Rose Society" – 3:12
"Bicycle" – 3:52
"Turn Your Pretty Name Around" – 4:51
"Saturday Morning on Sunday Street" – 3:53
"Kick the Wood" – 4:04
"Chamberlain, SD" – 3:42
"Black Eyes" – 4:25
"Doves And Stones" – 3:22
"My Gospel Song for You" – 3:44
"When the Wind Comes Up" – 3:39
"Bloody Hands" – 3:25
"Life's Warm Sheets" – 2:47
"Trap's Been Set" – 4:08
US Bonus Tracks:
"Precious Time" – 3:26
"Cotton Dress" – 2:58

Personnel
 Mark Olson – vocals, acoustic guitar, Fender Rhodes, Melodeon
 Gary Louris – vocals, acoustic guitar, electric guitar, harmonica
 George Reiff – bass
 Jimi Hey – drums
 Chris Robinson – harmonica, backing vocals
 Jason Yates – Hammond B-3 organ
 Ben Peeler – banjo, dobro
Production notes
 Michael Nieves – executive producer
 David Gorman – executive producer
 Chris Robinson – producer
 Beau Raymond - engineer
 Joe Gastwirst – mastering

References

External links
Jayhawks Mark Olson and Gary Louris Talk New Album, Paste Magazine

2008 albums
New West Records albums
Gary Louris albums
Albums produced by Chris Robinson (singer)
Mark Olson (musician) albums
Collaborative albums